Thomas Young (born 18 May 1992) is a Welsh rugby union player. A flanker, who plays rugby for Cardiff Rugby. Whilst under contract with the Cardiff Blues, he also played for Cardiff RFC and Pontypridd RFC. He is the son of former Wales international and former Wasps director of rugby Dai Young.

On 24 January 2014, Thomas Young was released early by Cardiff Blues as he signed a short-term deal to join Gloucester Rugby until the end of the 2013/14 season. On 13 May 2014, Thomas was signed to Wasps from the 2014–15 season, reuniting with his father, who was the Director of Rugby.

On 16 January 2017 Young was called up to the Wales Squad for the 2017 Six Nations Championship. In May 2017 he was named in the Wales senior squad for the tests against Tonga and Samoa in June 2017

On the 13 October 2021, Young and Cardiff Rugby confirmed that the flanker will play for the URC team from the 2022–2023 season onwards.

References

External links
 Cardiff Blues profile
 Gloucester Rugby profile
 Pontypridd RFC profile

1992 births
Living people
Rugby union players from Aberdare
Cardiff RFC players
Pontypridd RFC players
Cardiff Rugby players
Gloucester Rugby players
Wasps RFC players
Welsh rugby union players
People educated at Ysgol Gyfun Rhydywaun
Wales international rugby union players
Rugby union flankers